Let's Get Haunted (LGH) is an American paranormal and comedy podcast billed as "the only investigative journalism podcast about things that may or may not have even happened in the first place". The show is independently produced by the creators and hosts Alyssa Terry and Natalia Strawn.

History 
LGH was started by best friends Alyssa Terry and Natalia Strawn in February 2019 as a side project for both. The two met while attending college in California. They have stated that each episode takes anywhere from 24 hours to two weeks to produce from the research, recording, and editing processes. In its just over two-year run, the show has since grown from roughly 5,000 streams in its first month to more than 1,000,000 total and counting, supported by the paranormal-loving community known as "the Haunted Fam". As of July 2022, LGH has issued 113 full episodes, thirteen "Listener Stories" episodes, and three Q&A episodes through SoundCloud, Spotify, and Apple Podcasts.

Both Terry and Strawn are active in the LGH online community, frequently interacting with fans and members of the Haunted Fam through their Instagram, Twitter, Reddit, and Discord pages. Members are also often included in the show through submitted fan art and listener-contributed paranormal stories.

Format and Structure 
 
Each episode of the show features a theme or central story which Terry and Strawn alternate recanting for the other and the listeners. The episodes air on Wednesday and usually range from 1–2 hours including introductions, though some episodes have been more lengthy given the cases or to allow time for the hosts and/or guests to discuss their reactions and theories. In a 2020 profile with Shoutout LA, the creators stated that they "research and discuss only things that [they] find interesting, that way the content never feels forced". Topics hail from around the world and throughout history, including but not limited to: popular folklore like The Mothman of West Virginia, internet cases and phenomena such as the Happy Valley Dream Survey and the Lake City Quiet Pills, true crime cases like the Setagaya family murders and the disappearance of Lars Mittank, and historical events like the Dyatlov Pass Incident, Operation Wandering Soul, and the Andes Flight Disaster. The hosts do thorough research about each case, often first providing background of the time and location for each story.

Before diving into the topic, the hosts typically open with "personal hauntings" or stories about their personal lives and careers, bringing a lighter tone and often comedic introduction to the heavier cases.

Given the paranormal focus and "haunted" title, LGH takes an open-minded perspective to each topic, and entertains a wide range of theories for each case without casting doubt or criticizing them. While the hosts have pointed out that this approach makes for a more entertaining show, it is also an example of the positive messages and inspiration they strive to provide through their work. In a 2020 interview with Charleston, West Virginia's Gazette-Mail, Strawn stated of the shows' perspective, "I invite all the people out there in the world who are seeing this article, instead of saying no, you don't have to say yes, just say maybe to possibilities...and I promise you...if you just apply that to your life, it will open up for you so much more".

While the hosts typically gather sources from the internet, books, and other media, there have been a few instances of the hosts conducting their own interviews or primary research for the episode. Perhaps the most notable occurred in the 17th episode of the show titled "The Jamison Family Disappearance", which follows the true story of the Jamison's 2009 disappearance and deaths as presented by Terry. For this episode, Terry was able to access court records for the family's prior lawsuits that many theorize could have been related to their disappearance, as well as interview a woman who was involved in a motor vehicle accident with the family several years before, providing new insight and information into their lives and the still-unsolved case.

In addition to their podcast, Terry and Strawn have attended AlienCon Los Angeles 2019 and the September 2019 Area 51 gathering, which they vlogged and posted to their YouTube channel.

Notable guests 
Occasionally, episodes feature guests in place of or alongside the hosts. Those include:
 Actor, comedian, producer and screenwriter Jamie Kennedy
 Actors/writers James DeAngelis, James Allen McCune, Cib & Sami Jo James, and Steven Suptic of Sugar Pine 7
 Voiceover actress Mimi Torres
 Author and Randonautica creator Joshua Lengfelder & researcher and parapsychologist Dr. Dean Radin
 Comedians and YouTube personalities James and Elyse Willems of Funhaus
 Comedians Steve Zaragoza and Mike Falzone of Dynamic Banter!
 Animator, creator and host of the podcast Stories with Sapphire, Sapphire Sandalo
 Bruce and Autumn Greene of Rooster Teeth's Sugar Pine 7, Funhaus, and Inside Gaming

Philanthropy 
In 2020, LGH was able to organize through its community of listeners and raise $1,897 for nonprofit organization The Loveland Foundation to help provide free therapy and mental health support and services to black women and girls in the United States.

Host Aly Terry works full time as a human resources representative for farms and farmworkers in Ventura County, California, and was able to find support to advocate for small farms in local government cases and ultimately overturn nuisance laws that threatened their livelihood.

In 2021, the podcast created a fundraiser to support the Lupus Foundation of America, donating proceeds from the month of July to the cause.

Awards and nominations 
In 2021, Let's Get Haunted was chosen as a finalist for Best Podcast at the Shorty Awards. They were awarded the Audience Honor for the Best Podcast category with the most fan votes of any podcast in May 2021.

LGH was one of ten nominees for Best Female-Hosted Podcast at the 2021 People's Choice Podcast Awards.

In April 2021, the podcast made their first appearance on Paranormality Magazine's monthly Top 25 Podcast chart at #4. They appeared at #1 for three consecutive months on the same list from June to August of the same year. They were also a finalist for Paranormality Magazine's Best Ghost Stories Podcast and Best Female-Lead Podcast of 2021.

Episode list 
Odd numbered episodes are hosted by Alyssa and even numbered episodes are hosted by Nat.

*Episode 69 appeared before Episode 68 on Tuesday, April 20, 2021

References

External links 
 

American podcasts